Knipowitschia punctatissima, the Italian spring goby, is a species of goby endemic to Italy where it inhabits fresh, clear waters of springs, streams, and channels with slow water movements.  This species can reach a length of  SL.

References

Italian spring goby
Freshwater fish of Europe
Endemic fauna of Italy
Near threatened animals
Fish described in 1864
Taxonomy articles created by Polbot
Taxobox binomials not recognized by IUCN